Frederick Habib Yambapou Issaka (born 28 July 2006) is a Welsh footballer who plays as a forward for  club Plymouth Argyle. He is a youth international for Wales.

Club career
Issaka became Plymouth Argyle's youngest ever player when he made his professional debut on 31 August 2021, when he featured off the bench in a 2–0 EFL Cup defeat to Newport County. Aged just 15 years and 34 days, he broke the record previously set by Lee Phillips in 1996.

On 12 November 2022, Issaka made his league debut, appearing as a substitute in Plymouth Argyle's 1–1 EFL League One draw away to Lincoln City.

International career
Born in England, Issaka is of Ghanaian, English and Welsh descent. In September 2021, he was called-up by a Wales U16 training camp. The next month he was selected in the squad for their Victory Shield campaign.

In December 2021, Issaka featured twice for England U16s, in a pair of friendlies at St George's Park vs Turkey U16s.

In 2022 Issaka was again selected to represent Wales. In April he featured in an under-16 UEFA Development Tournament, and in October playing for the under-17s in three UEFA Euro U17 Championship qualifiers, scoring in a 3–3 draw with Sweden.

Career statistics

References

External links

2006 births
Living people
Sportspeople from Truro
Welsh footballers
Wales youth international footballers
English footballers
Welsh people of English descent
Welsh people of Ghanaian descent
English people of Welsh descent
English sportspeople of Ghanaian descent
Association football forwards
Plymouth Argyle F.C. players
English Football League players